Thomas Wizenmann (1759 – 1787) was a German philosopher of the Enlightenment, a critic of Kant and Mendelssohn during the Pantheism controversy. He wrote  Die Resultate der Jacobischer und Mendelsohnischen Philosophie kritisch erläutert von einem Freywilligen. Wizenmann was a follower of F. H. Jacobi, a critic of Enlightenment Rationalism.

References

1787 deaths
1759 births
German philosophers